Astelia nervosa, also known as mountain astelia or, along with a number of other species, as bush flax, is a herbaceous plant native to New Zealand. A. nervosa has long, flexible, leathery leaves that are light green and grey in colour. The flowers are light brown to red in colour. The mature fruits are generally orange.

It is found in lowland to low alpine areas from the southern North Island south to Stewart Island.

References

Asteliaceae
Flora of New Zealand
Taxa named by Joseph Dalton Hooker